Click of Respect is a collaboration album by American rapper Kool G Rap and hip hop group 5 Family Click. 5 Family Click would later be featured on various mixtapes and productions in future Kool G Rap works.

Track listing 
 "Intro" 1:07
 "I Die 4 U" feat. 40 CAL Hammerz, Glory Warz, G Rap Giancana & Ma Barker 4:44
 "Cold World" feat. G Rap Giancana, Ma Barker & Angie Mendez 3:28
 "Blackin Out" feat. G Rap Giancana 2:31
 "Breaker Breaker" feat. 40 CAL Hammerz, Glory Warz, G Rap Giancana & Ma Barker 4:28
 "Click Of Respect" feat. 40 CAL Hammerz, G Rap Giancana & Ma Barker 4:28
 "Get da Drop on Em" feat. G Rap Giancana 3:41
 "Gully" feat. 5 Family Click 4:06
 "On My Grind" feat. Glory Warz & Ma Barker 3:31
 "Pimped Out" feat. Dan Da Man & Ma Barker 4:21
 "Slide in My Whip" feat. G Rap Giancana & Ma Barker 4:22
 "Air U Out" feat. G Rap Giancana 4:02
 "Niggah Nah" feat. Glory Warz 3:40
 "Sick Wit It" feat. 40 CAL Hammerz, G Rap Giancana & Ma Barker 2:56
 "Stop Playin Wit Me" feat. 40 CAL Hammerz, G Rap Giancana & Ma Barker 3:35
 "I Am What I Am" feat. Ma Barker 2:42
 "Takin Over" feat. G Rap Giancana & Ma Barker 4:00
 "Never Gonna Let You Go (Bonus Track)" feat. Ma Barker & Angie Mendez 3:21

Cover art 

Featuring photography by Maya Hayuk and Art Directed / Designed by Keith Corcoran, the multi-page CD booklet featured photos of G Rap Giancana, Ma Barker, 40 CAL Hammerz and Glory Warz depicted as the focus of a law enforcement investigation.

Charts

References

2003 albums
Kool G Rap albums
Albums produced by Buckwild